Apopka High School is in Apopka in northwest Orange County, Florida, United States. The school has been named a Blue Ribbon School of Excellence.

The school serves grades 9 through 12, and has a preschool with a main teacher and student teachers.

History 
According to a historical marker placed by the Apopka Historical Society, "Apopka's first public schoolhouse [was] built in 1885. It was a small three-room building that stood beside the original Apopka Baptist Church, west of the site known as the Old Church Cemetery... In 1891, the schoolhouse at this site burned down, forcing classes to be relocated to another building for the remainder of the year."

The historical marker continues, "In 1896, voters approved the construction of a new schoolhouse on Fourth Street, later Main Street. The new school opened for the 1897 school year." In 1901 the State of Florida accredited the school, which was named Apopka Union School. That school building was destroyed by a tornado in 1918, and was rebuilt by May 1925.

To honor WWII veterans, in 1953 the school's name was changed to Apopka Memorial High School, serving grades 7–12.

In 1976, according to the school's alumni association, "Orange County Public Schools built a new school at the current location on Martin Road modifying the name to Apopka High School, and in 2009, the school was completely rebuilt."

Apopka High's accreditation was last renewed in 2010 by AdvancED: Southern Association of Colleges and Schools.

Desegregation 
According to Orange County Schools History, 

In 1969, the first Black faculty and some students from all-Black Phyllis Wheatley High School (previously known as Apopka Colored School) were admitted to the school. Nine of the school's 63 faculty members that year were Black, as were 336 of the school's 1,269 students.

A large percentage of residents of both races opposed the plan. 95% of Black residents wanted Wheatley to stay open, but most white residents did not want integration at all. As a result, over 3,000 students boycotted the schools. Despite these issues, the consolidation was described as one of the smoothest in Orange County.

Athletics
Apopka competes in the Florida High School Athletic Association and has about 26 total sports teams.

The football team won the class 6A State Championship in 2001.  Since then the Apopka Blue Darters, led by Head Coach Rick Darlington, have collected two 8A state titles ('12 & '14) along with a 2013 state runner-up. The Apopka High School football team competes in District 4, Region 1 of FHSAA Class 8A.  They hold an overall record of 106-29 since 2005.

Apopka High School boys varsity bowling team had three consecutive undefeated seasons in 2013, 2014, and 2015.  The boys' varsity team won the 2013 and 2014 Men's bowling state championships undefeated both years with the same five starters on the team for both years.

The boys basketball team won the 1962 Class A state championship.

Curriculum
Apopka High School has a dedicated classroom for students to work on their Florida Virtual School assignments, a new graduation requirement instituted first for the class of 2015. Adult education courses have been provided since at least 1974.

Demographics

Enrollment for the 2021–2022 school year included 1,120 Hispanic students, 1,083 Black students, 1,066 White students, 67 Asian students, 6 American Indian/Alaska Native students, and 75 students of two or more races.

Notable alumni

John Anderson (musician), American country musician
Steve Baylark, professional football player, Sacramento Mountain Lions
Rogers Beckett, former professional football player, San Diego Chargers, Cincinnati Bengals
Rod Brewer, former MLB player (St. Louis Cardinals).
Jalen Carter, football player
Joe Chealey, basketball player
Chandler Cox, professional football player for the Miami Dolphins
Kenny Edenfield, football player and coach
Jeremy Gallon, football player
Zack Greinke, professional baseball player, Kansas City Royals, Anaheim Angels, Milwaukee Brewers, Los Angeles Dodgers, Arizona Diamondbacks and Houston Astros.
Trey Hendrickson, NFL defensive end for the Cincinnati Bengals
Martez Ivey, football player
Aaron Jones, professional football player, Pittsburgh Steelers, New England Patriots, Miami Dolphins.
James McKnight, former professional football player, Seattle Seahawks, Dallas Cowboys, Miami Dolphins, New York Giants.
Brandon Meriweather, former professional football player, New England Patriots, Washington Redskins, New York Giants.
Glenn "Fireball" Roberts, pioneer NASCAR driver.
Warren Sapp, former professional football player, Oakland Raiders, Tampa Bay Buccaneers, Pro Football Hall of Fame.
Donald Scott professional athletics Team USA jumper, Eastern Michigan University coach
Sammie Smith, former professional football player, Miami Dolphins, Denver Broncos
Michael Taylor, former professional baseball player, Philadelphia Phillies, Oakland Athletics, and Chicago White Sox.
Kyle Wilber, NFL linebacker for the Oakland Raiders
J. T. Wise, baseball player

Notable faculty
Bryan L. Reuss, orthopaedic surgeon

References

External links
 Apopka High School's Official Website
 A "Blue Darter" is a chicken hawk, or Cooper's hawk
 Apopka HS 2020-21 Report Card

Orange County Public Schools
High schools in Orange County, Florida
Public high schools in Florida
Apopka, Florida
1931 establishments in Florida
Educational institutions established in 1931